Equipo Bolivia is a Bolivian UCI Continental cycling team established in 2017.

Team roster

References

Cycling teams based in Bolivia
Cycling teams established in 2017
UCI Continental Teams (America)